Airports Economic Regulatory Authority (AERA) is a regulatory agency under Government of India to regulate tariff and other expenditure & fees for major airports. It is a statutory body constituted under the Airports Economic Regulatory Authority of India Act (AERA), 2008.

Functions
It works according to provisions of AERA Act 2008. It regulates tariffs and fees charged to airports and passengers and monitors the quality of service.

References

Regulatory agencies of India
Airport operators
Aviation authorities
Ministry of Civil Aviation (India)
Government-owned companies of India